The Société Nigérienne de Transports de Voyageurs or SNTV (English: Nigerien Passenger Transport Company) is the Nigerien government owned bus and public transport company.

Operation
The SNTV operates an inter-city and limited international coach system, as well as the "Gare Routieres" or "Autogares": Coach, truck, and taxi stations found in most Nigerien cities. In a nation with no rail system and low automobile ownership, SNTV and private coaches, buses, and taxis are the primary means of intracity travel for most Nigeriens.

History
The SNTV was hived off from the older STNN in the mid-1960s. The STNN sense focuses on commercial cargo haulage, but the SNTV still maintains a package service, while the STNN transport passengers in some more remote routes.

As of 2009, the United States government reports that SNTV "has experienced no known major accidents since 2001."

Routes
Domestic service routes:
Niamey – Maradi – Zinder
Niamey – Tahoua – Agadez - Arlit
Zinder – Agadez – Arlit
Zinder – Diffa – N'guigmi 	

International service routes:
Niamey – Cotonou – Lomé – Accra
Niamey – Ouagadougou
Niamey – Bamako
Niamey – Gao

See also
Transport in Niger

References

External links
sntv.biz: SNTV official Website.

Transport in Niger
Bus companies of Niger
Companies based in Niamey